Carlo Margottini (F 595) was a Bergamini-class frigate of the Italian Navy.

Construction and career 
She was laid down on 26 May 1957 and launched on 12 June 1960 by Navalmeccanica. She was commissioned on 5 May 1962.

Carlo Margottini and Virginio Fasan were discarded in 1988 respectively.

Gallery

References 

 Blackman, Raymond V. B. Jane's Fighting Ships 1962–63. London: Sampson Low, Marston & Company, 1962.
 Blackman, Raymond V. B. Jane's Fighting Ships 1971–72. London: Sampson Low, Marston & Company, 1971. .
 Gardiner, Robert and Stephen Chumbley. Conway's All The World's Fighting Ships 1947–1995. Annapolis, Maryland USA: Naval Institute Press, 1995. .

Ships built in Italy
1960 ships
Bergamini-class frigates